David John Battley (5 November 1935 – 20 January 2003) was a British actor of stage and screen, mainly appearing in comedy roles.

Early life
Battley was born at Battersea, London, the elder son of John Battley, a post-Second World War Labour MP, and his wife Sybill (née Allchurch). Born with a hole in the heart, he was initially home schooled before attending a special school. He later enrolled at Camberwell School of Art but left before completing the course. He earned a living working for the family printing firm, Battley Brothers, before applying to Royal Academy of Dramatic Art. Battley had one brother, Bernard.

Career
Battley used a dry, ironic delivery on television and in films. He found steady work as a character actor and comic stooge. Battley's TV work ranged from the satire show BBC-3 and the military police drama Redcap in the 1960s through Eric Sykes' BBC sitcom, the 1975 TV adaptation of Moll Flanders, the 1977 Christmas Special of The Good Life, and later The Bill, Lovejoy, The Beiderbecke Tapes as John the hippy barman, and Mr. Bean. Battley also appears as the Executioner in the 1966 BBC production of Alice in Wonderland. He also appeared in the mid-1970s as a foil to Eric Idle in the BBC series Rutland Weekend Television (1975–1976). Battley played the Paul McCartney role in the original RWT sketch of The Rutles, a parody of The Beatles, but did not appear in the American TV film All You Need Is Cash, based on the sketch.

Battley also featured in films, including Hotel Paradiso (1966), Crossplot (1969), Willy Wonka & the Chocolate Factory (1971), Up the Chastity Belt (1972), Up the Front (1972), That's Your Funeral (1972), Rentadick (1972), Don't Just Lie There, Say Something! (1973), Mister Quilp (1975), S.O.S. Titanic (1979), The London Connection (1979) and Krull (1983).

In 1990 he appeared in an early episode of One Foot in the Grave. Among his last roles were a miniature golf course employee in the Mr. Bean episode "Tee Off, Mr. Bean" (1995), and a doctor examining new regimental recruits in Sharpe's Regiment (1996).

Personal life and death
Battley had two daughters, Zoe S. Battley and E. Martha Battley. He died on 20 January 2003, after suffering a heart attack, at the age of 67, in Epsom, Surrey, England.

Filmography

Film

Television

References

External links

1935 births
2003 deaths
20th-century English male actors
Alumni of RADA
English male film actors
English male television actors
Male actors from London
People from Battersea
The Rutles members